Plebeiogryllus is a genus of crickets in the family Gryllidae and tribe Gryllini.  Species have been found in the Indian subcontinent, southern China, Indo-China and the Philippines.

Species 
Plebeiogryllus includes the following species:
Plebeiogryllus guttiventris (Walker, 1871)
Plebeiogryllus plebejus (Saussure, 1877) - type species (as Gryllus plebejus Saussure locality: the Philippines)
Plebeiogryllus retiregularis Saeed, Saeed & Yousuf, 2000
Plebeiogryllus spurcatus (Walker, 1869)

References

External links
 

Ensifera genera
crickets
Orthoptera of Indo-China
Orthoptera of Asia